The 2017 Sparkassen Open was a professional tennis tournament played on clay courts. It was the 24th edition of the tournament which was part of the 2017 ATP Challenger Tour. It took place in Braunschweig, Germany between 10 and 15 July 2017.

Singles main-draw entrants

Seeds

 1 Rankings are as of 3 July 2017.

Other entrants
The following players received wildcards into the singles main draw:
  Daniel Altmaier
  Yannick Maden
  Louis Wessels
  Horacio Zeballos

The following players received entry into the singles main draw as special exempts:
  Viktor Galović
  Cedrik-Marcel Stebe

The following players received entry from the qualifying draw:
  Nicola Kuhn
  Axel Michon
  Gonçalo Oliveira
  George von Massow

Champions

Singles

  Nicola Kuhn def.  Viktor Galović 2–6, 7–5, 4–2 ret.

Doubles

  Julian Knowle /  Igor Zelenay def.  Kevin Krawietz /  Gero Kretschmer 6–3, 7–6(7–3).

External links
Official Website

Sparkassen Open
2017
2017 in German tennis